Jerry Charles Aldridge (born September 17, 1956) is a former professional American football halfback in the National Football League (NFL). He attended Angelo State University where he was selected as an AP College Division All-American, and led the team to an NAIA championship in 1978. He played with the San Francisco 49ers in 1980. He also played for the Oakland Invaders in the USFL, scoring a touchdown on an 80-yard pass play in June 1983. His son, Cory was a Major League Baseball outfielder.

References

External links
Pro-Football reference

1956 births
Living people
People from Jacksonville, Texas
Players of American football from Texas
American football halfbacks
Angelo State Rams football players
San Francisco 49ers players